"Share This Wine" is a song written by Greg Arnold and recorded by Australian folk-rock band Things of Stone and Wood. The song was released in September 1992 as the lead single from the band's debut studio album The Yearning. "Share This Wine" peaked at number 46 on the ARIA Charts in October 1992.
 
At the ARIA Music Awards of 1993, the song was nominated for two awards; winning ARIA Award for Best New Talent.

Track listing

Charts

References

1992 songs
1992 singles
ARIA Award-winning songs
Things of Stone and Wood songs
Songs written by Greg Arnold